Alexandra Morgan Carrasco (born Alexandra Patricia Morgan; July 2, 1989) is an American professional soccer player who plays as a striker and captains for San Diego Wave FC of the National Women's Soccer League (NWSL), the highest division of women's professional soccer in the United States, and the United States women's national soccer team. 
She co-captained the United States women's national soccer team with Carli Lloyd and Megan Rapinoe from 2018 to 2020.

Shortly after graduating early from the University of California, Berkeley, where she played for the California Golden Bears, Morgan was drafted number one overall in the 2011 WPS Draft by the Western New York Flash. There, she made her professional debut and helped the team win the league championship. Morgan, who was 22 at the time, was the youngest player on the national team at the 2011 FIFA Women's World Cup, where the team was runner-up. At the 2012 London Olympics, she scored the match-winning goal in the 123rd minute of the semi-final match against Canada. She finished 2012 with 28 goals and 21 assists, joining Mia Hamm as the only American woman to score 20 goals and provide 20 assists in the same calendar year and making her the sixth and youngest U.S. player to score 20 goals in a single season. She was subsequently named U.S. Soccer Female Athlete of the Year and was a FIFA World Player of the Year finalist. Morgan also helped the United States win their titles at the 2015 and 2019 FIFA Women's World Cups, where she was named to the Dream Team for both tournaments, while she won the Silver Boot in 2019.

In 2013, the inaugural season of the National Women's Soccer League, Morgan joined Portland Thorns FC and helped the team win the league title that year. Morgan played for the Thorns through the 2015 season, after which she was traded to first-year franchise Orlando Pride. In 2017, Morgan signed with French team Lyon, where she won the continental European treble, which included the UEFA Women's Champions League.

Off the field, Morgan teamed with Simon & Schuster to write a middle-grade book series about four soccer players: The Kicks. The first book in the series, Saving the Team, debuted at number seven on The New York Times Best Seller list in May 2013. Additionally, a film starring Morgan in her acting debut, Alex & Me, was released in June 2018 where she plays a fictionalized version of herself.

In 2015, Morgan was ranked by Time as the top-paid American women's soccer player, largely due to her numerous endorsement deals. Morgan, along with Canada's Christine Sinclair and Australia's Steph Catley, became the first women's soccer players to appear on the cover of FIFA video games in 2015 – Morgan appeared alongside Lionel Messi on covers of FIFA 16 sold in the United States. She was named one of [[Time's 100 Most Influential People|Times 100 Most Influential People]] of 2019 and 2022.

Early life
Born to Pamela and Michael Morgan in the Los Angeles County suburb of San Dimas, California, Morgan was raised with her two older sisters, Jeni and Jeri, in the nearby suburb of Diamond Bar. She was a multi-sport athlete growing up and began playing soccer at an early age with AYSO, and her father was among her first coaches. However, she did not begin playing club soccer until age 14 when she joined Cypress Elite. With the club team, she won the Coast Soccer League (CSL) under-16 championship and placed third at the under-19 level.

Morgan attended Diamond Bar High School, where she was a three-time all-league pick and was named All-American by the National Soccer Coaches Association of America (NSCAA). At the school, she was known for her speed and sprinting ability. Morgan played for Olympic Development Program (ODP) regional and state teams as well. She later credited the program as an integral part of her development as a soccer player: "... programs like ODP helped me especially because I did come into the club scene late and it was important for me to play as much as possible, play with the best players and learn from the best coaches. That, for me, was crucial to my development."

At age 17, Morgan was called up to the United States under-20 women's national soccer team. While playing in a scrimmage against the men's junior national team, she sustained an anterior cruciate ligament (ACL) injury and did not play for the team again until April 2008.

California Golden Bears (2007–2010)
Morgan attended University of California, Berkeley, where she played for the California Golden Bears from 2007 to 2010.
She led the Cal Bears in scoring during her first season with the team. During a match against Stanford in the second round of the 2007 NCAA Division I Women's Soccer Championship, Morgan scored an equalizer with less than two minutes left in regulation time, resulting in a 1–1 draw. The team was ultimately defeated during penalty kicks. Despite continued absences due to U.S. national team commitments throughout her collegiate career, Morgan led Cal in scoring and helped the team reach the NCAA Tournament four years in a row, advancing to the second round twice.

After being named a candidate for the Hermann Trophy during her junior year, Morgan became the first Golden Bear to be one of the top three finalists for the award. She was one of four finalists for the Honda Sports Award, given to the best overall candidate in each sport.

Morgan finished her collegiate career ranked third all-time in goals scored (45) and points (106) for Cal. She graduated from Berkeley one semester early, with a degree in Political Economy.

Club career
Western New York Flash (2011)

On January 14, 2011, Morgan was the first overall pick in the 2011 WPS Draft by the Western New York Flash. She was the first Cal player to be drafted in the first round of Women's Professional Soccer (WPS). Morgan scored her first goal for the Flash during the team's home opener—a 3–0 win over the Atlanta Beat on May 1, 2011. Throughout the 2011 season, she played in 14 matches and scored four goals. The club won the regular season title and the WPS Championship title the same year.

Seattle Sounders Women (2012)
After the WPS later suspended operations in early 2012 due to legal and financial difficulties, Morgan joined her national teammates Hope Solo, Sydney Leroux, Megan Rapinoe and Stephanie Cox on the Seattle Sounders Women for the 2012 season. Of her signing, Morgan said, "I am excited to play in a city that is so passionate about soccer. The Sounders have been one of, if not the best fan support in MLS. I can only imagine how Seattle fans would respond to having a full professional women's team in the future."

Due to her national team commitments and preparation for the 2012 Summer Olympics, Morgan made three regular season appearances for the club. She scored two goals and served two assist in her 253 minutes on the pitch. With the national teammates' presence on the team, the Sounders sold out nine of their ten home matches at the 4,500 capacity Starfire Stadium. Average attendance during the 2012 season for the Sounders Women was four times higher than the next closest team.

Portland Thorns FC (2013–2015)

On January 11, 2013, Morgan was one of three U.S. national team players to join the Portland Thorns FC for the inaugural season of the National Women's Soccer League via the NWSL Player Allocation. She scored her first goal for the Thorns during the team's home-opener at Jeld-Wen Field in front of 16,479 spectators helping her team defeat the Seattle Reign FC 2–1. She finished the regular season as the team's point leader, and joint scoring leader (with Christine Sinclair), with eight goals and five assists (21 points). The club finished third during the regular season led by head coach Cindy Parlow Cone. On August 31, 2013, Portland captured the league's inaugural championship title after defeating regular season champions Western New York Flash 2–0; Morgan assisted on the second goal. Morgan was named to the NWSL Second XI on August 28.

Morgan returned to the Thorns for the 2014 season led by new head coach Paul Riley. She scored six goals in her 15 appearances for the club. The Thorns finished third during the regular season with a  record and advanced to the playoffs for the second consecutive season. The team was defeated by eventual champions FC Kansas City 2–0.

During the 2015 season, Morgan made four appearances for the Thorns due to her national team commitments at the 2015 FIFA Women's World Cup. She scored one goal during a 3–3 draw against the Washington Spirit on August 31. The Thorns finished in sixth place during the regular season with a  record.

Orlando Pride (2016)

On October 26, 2015, it was announced that the Thorns had traded Morgan, along with teammate Kaylyn Kyle, to an expansion team Orlando Pride in exchange for the Pride's number one picks in the 2015 NWSL Expansion Draft and 2016 NWSL College Draft as well as an international roster spot for the 2016 and 2017 seasons. Morgan scored four goals in her 15 appearances for the Pride. The club finished in ninth place during the regular season with a  record led by head coach Tom Sermanni.

Lyon (2017)

On January 5, 2017, Morgan signed with French champions Olympique Lyonnais (Lyon) for a reported $33,000 per month. The six-month contracted included a mutual option for an additional season.

She made her 2016–17 Division 1 Féminine debut on January 14 during a 3–0 win against En Avant de Guingamp and recorded two assists. During a match against ASPTT Albi on March 17, she scored a brace in the second half to help lift the team to a 5–0 win. On May 7, she scored a brace during the team's 9–0 win over ASJ Soyaux after which the club was named league champions for the ninth consecutive season. She scored five goals in her eight appearances during the regular season.

On March 12, Morgan scored a hat-trick against Rodez to lead Lyon to a 6–0 win and advance to the semi-finals of the French Cup. She scored four goals and recorded two assists during the semi-final against Hénin-Beaumont (three of the four occurred within a ten-minute span). Lyon won the Cup after a penalty shootout on May 19. Morgan did not play during the French Cup final due to a lingering hamstring injury suffered during a match against Paris Saint-Germain.

Morgan made her 2016–17 UEFA Women's Champions League debut in the first leg of the quarterfinals on March 23 during the team's 2–0 win over VfL Wolfsburg. On June 1, she started in the 2017 UEFA Women's Champions League Final but subbed off after 23 minutes due to the hamstring injury. Lyon won the match after a penalty shootout.

Return to Orlando (2017–2020)
Following the Champions League Final, the Pride announced Morgan's addition to their 2017 active roster on June 21, 2017, waiving Christina Burkenroad to make room on the 20-player roster. After recovering from the hamstring injury she suffered in the final, Morgan made her competitive return for Orlando on July 1 against the Chicago Red Stars. Morgan scored nine goals in fourteen games for Orlando in 2017, and the team achieved an  record. On October 7, Morgan played the entirety of the Pride's first ever NWSL playoff match, a 4–1 loss to the eventual champions Portland Thorns FC. Following the season's end, Morgan was named to the league's 2017 Second XI.

Although her contract with Lyon included an option for a return in 2018, Morgan announced in September 2017 that she would terminate the contract and instead return to Orlando for the start of the] 2018 season. Morgan played in nineteen games for the Pride, contributing five goals over the course of the season.

Morgan spent most of the 2019 season on international duty, including the World Cup, before ending the season injured. She only featured in six games for Orlando and failed to score, the first time she ended a Pride season scoreless.

In October 2019 she announced she was pregnant, eventually giving birth in May 2020. Morgan missed the early-summer 2020 NWSL Challenge Cup tournament held following the disruption of the season caused by the COVID-19 pandemic. She returned to training with the Pride in early September ahead of the Fall Series, the September–October slate of games scheduled for the end of the season.

Tottenham Hotspur (2020)
On September 12, 2020, Morgan signed with English FA Women's Super League team Tottenham Hotspur. The contract reportedly ran from September through December 2020, with an option to extend the deal through the end of the 2020–21 FA WSL season in May 2021. Orlando retained Morgan's NWSL rights. Still trying to regain fitness having not played since August 2019 and giving birth in May 2020, Morgan eventually made her Spurs debut on November 7, 2020, appearing as a 69th-minute substitute in a 1–1 WSL draw against Reading. On November 14 she made her first start for Spurs, playing 45 minutes in a 2–2 draw with Bristol City before being substituted at half-time. In her third appearance Morgan played against North London rivals Arsenal in the League Cup group stage, substituting on at half-time. The match finished in a 2–2 tie and a penalty shootout with Morgan the only player to not convert, instead firing the decisive penalty over the crossbar in a 5–4 defeat. She scored her first goal for the club on December 6, 2020, an 84th-minute penalty in a 3–1 victory over Brighton & Hove Albion, Spurs' first league win of the season. The following week, Morgan scored her second penalty in as many games as Spurs beat Aston Villa 3–1. On December 21, Tottenham Hotspur announced that Morgan would end her contract with the club and return to the US.

Return to Orlando (2021)
Morgan returned to Orlando Pride ahead of the 2021 season. Having missed the start of the 2021 NWSL Challenge Cup while on international duty to play in friendlies against Sweden and France, Morgan made her first appearance for Orlando since August 2019 on April 21, 2021, in a 1–0 Challenge Cup win over Washington Spirit, a total of 609 days. She registered an assist on the only goal of the game, scored by Sydney Leroux. Morgan scored in each of the first four games of the regular season as Orlando went unbeaten and finished May at the top of the table. It was the first time a player had scored in each of the first four games of a season in league history. She was named NWSL Player of the Month for only the second time in her career in May 2021.

San Diego Wave FC (2022–present)
On December 13, 2021, San Diego Wave FC announced the signing of Morgan. The terms of the trade were revealed three days later following the opening of the trade window with Orlando receiving a record $275,000 in Allocation Money and Angharad James in return.

International career

Due to the ACL injury that slowed her progress in 2007, Morgan was not called up to train with the United States under-20 women's national soccer team until April 2008. Her first appearance for the under-20 team occurred during the 2008 CONCACAF Women's U-20 Championship in Puebla, Mexico, where she scored her first international goal against Cuba.

Morgan was named to the United States U-20 women's national team that competed in the 2008 FIFA U-20 Women's World Cup in Chile, scoring a total of four goals in the tournament against France, Argentina and North Korea. Morgan's fourth goal was a match-winner that won the U.S. the tournament, which was subsequently voted the best goal of the tournament, and later FIFA's second-best goal of the year. Her performance on the field earned her the Bronze Shoe as the tournament's third-highest scorer and the Silver Ball as the tournament's second-best player behind teammate Sydney Leroux.

She has been capped by the senior national team, first appearing as a substitute in a match versus Mexico in March 2010, and scored her first international goal after coming on as a substitute against China, which salvaged a 1–1 draw in October 2010. Her most important goal to date came a month later in a crucial road match against Italy. After entering the match in the 86th minute, she scored in the fourth minute of added time to give the United States a 1–0 victory over Italy in the first leg of a playoff to qualify for the final spot for the Women's World Cup.

2011 FIFA Women's World Cup
Morgan was the youngest player on the U.S. national team that placed second in the 2011 FIFA Women's World Cup. On July 13, 2011, she scored her first FIFA Women's World Cup goal in the 82nd minute of the semi-final matchup against France, giving the USA a 3–1 lead and ultimately, the victory. She scored the first goal (69') in the FIFA World Cup final against Japan after coming on as a substitute at the half, as well as assisting on the Abby Wambach header (104') for a goal in extra time. Her performance made her the first player to ever record a goal and an assist in a World Cup final. Morgan finished eighth in the balloting for the 2011 FIFA World Player of the Year.

2012 London Olympics
Morgan did not become a starter for the U.S. until the fifth match of the year in January, the final of the CONCACAF Olympic qualifying tournament. She scored twice and provided two assists to Wambach that day, in a 4–0 win over the Canadian hosts and has become a regular starter ever since. Between January and late May 2012, Morgan scored 14 goals in a 12-match stretch including a sequence of three straight two-goal efforts on January 29, February 11 and 29. She earned her first career hat-trick on March 7, 2012, during a 4–0 victory against Sweden in the third-place match of the Algarve Cup. In June 2012, she was nominated for an ESPY Award as the Best Breakthrough Athlete.

In the opening match of 2012 London Olympics group play, Morgan scored both the equalizer and the goal that sealed the win against France. In the next three Olympic matches, she assisted on the match-winning goal, including two to Wambach.

Morgan scored the winning goal in the Olympic semi-final match against Canada in extra time, sending the United States to the gold medal match against Japan. Her goal came in the 123rd minute, the latest goal ever scored by a member of the U.S. women's team and a FIFA record. The goal continued her propensity for late heroics in the closing stages of matches. Seventeen of her 28 total goals to date have come after the 60th minute. The match-winning goal was Morgan's team-high 20th in 2012, becoming only the sixth and youngest U.S. player to do so in a single year. In the final, a 2–1 win against Japan on August 9, Morgan assisted on a Carli Lloyd header. She ended the tournament with three goals, and a team-high four assists (tied with Megan Rapinoe) and ten points (tied with Rapinoe and Wambach).
To celebrate her achievements, she was honored at her former high school and the No. 13 jersey was retired.

In 2012, Morgan led the U.S. in goals (28), multi-goal matches (9), assists (21) and points (77). Her calendar year goals, assists and points totals are the third-best, tied second-best (one tally shy of record), and second-best, respectively, in USWNT history. Morgan joined an exclusive club as she and Hamm are the only USWNT players to record at least 20 goals and 20 assists in the same calendar year and became only the third and youngest player to reach 20 assists in a calendar year. Morgan and Wambach combined for 55 goals in 2012 – matching a 21-year-old record set in 1991 by Michelle Akers (39 goals) and Carin Jennings (16 goals) as the most goals scored by any duo in USWNT history. She had either scored or assisted on 41 percent of the USA's 120 goals this year. And, by herself, she comfortably out-scored and out-assisted her opponents, who combined for 21 goals and 12 assists in 32 matches against the U.S.

For her excellence on the field, U.S. Soccer announced Morgan as the 2012 Female Athlete of the Year. Morgan's exploits have also earned her a place on the FIFA Ballon d'Or shortlist, ultimately finished third in voting.

2013–14
At the 2013 Algarve Cup, Morgan shared top-scoring honors. She finished the competition with four assists and three goals, including the equalizer against Sweden that advanced the U.S. to the final and the two goals against Germany that won the championship. She previously won the tournament's golden boot in 2011. On June 2, 2013, Morgan scored two-second-half goals as the U.S. defeated Canada 3–0 in front of a sold-out crowd in Toronto. This was the first match between USA and Canada since the epic semi-final of the 2012 Olympic Games. Morgan was named to her third appearance on the 10-player short list for FIFA Women's World Player of the Year in 2013 and finished fourth in the voting. For the inaugural CONCACAF Awards, she was recognized as the CONCACAF 2013 Female Player of the Year. And as a part of U.S. Soccer's celebration of its Centennial anniversary the Federation revealed the US Soccer's All-Time Women's National Team Best XI, she was youngest player selected at 24 years old.

Morgan had a return of five goals in seven matches for the USWNT in 2014 after returning from injury before she reinjured her ankle at the 2014 CONCACAF Women's Championship, which ruled her out for the rest of tournament.

2015 FIFA Women's World Cup
Morgan scored in a 1–0 friendly win over England in February upon her return to the international fold. She was part of the USWNT that won its tenth Algarve Cup in 2015. She scored in the 3–0 defeat of Switzerland.

Morgan spent two months recovering from a knee injury in the build-up to the 2015 FIFA Women's World Cup. Morgan's knee injury happened in April during the NWSL season against the Boston Breakers. She made her first start at the World Cup finals as the U.S. defeated Nigeria 1–0 in the last group match to advance as group winners. She registered her only goal of the World Cup's knockout stage with the opener in the 2–0 last 16 win over Colombia. Morgan did, however, win penalties for the USWNT in the 2–0 victories against Colombia in the last 16 and Germany in the semi-finals, respectively. She then started the 2015 FIFA Women's World Cup final as the USWNT defeated Japan 5–2 to win its third FIFA Women's World Cup. Morgan played in all seven World Cup finals matches and started in every one of them since being restored to the starting XI against Nigeria.

2016 Rio Olympics
At the first SheBelieves Cup competition in March 2016, an invitational four-team tournament consisted of England, France, Germany and the United States, Morgan was awarded the Golden Boot and the MVP award. She scored in victories against France and Germany as the USWNT won the tournament with three wins from three. Morgan scored eight goals during her first nine appearances of 2016.

Morgan marked her 100th cap for the USWNT in a 5–0 friendly win against Republic of Ireland on January 23, by registering a goal and an assist. At the CONCACAF Olympic Qualifiers in February, Morgan scored the fastest recorded goal in tournament history and in the history of the USWNT, netting after just 12 seconds, before later adding a second, in a 5–0 defeat of Costa Rica. She followed this up with her third career hat-trick in a win against Trinidad and Tobago, as the USWNT secured their qualification for the Rio Olympics. Morgan started in the qualification final against Canada, as the USWNT won 2–0 to be crowned tournament winners. She was voted in the Best XI for the tournament.

Morgan was named to the United States' 18-player roster for the Rio Olympics on July 12, 2016. She started and scored a goal in the team's opening match vs New Zealand on August 3. The United States was knocked out of the tournament in the quarter-final round via a penalty shootout loss to Sweden. Morgan scored the equalizer in regulation time to draw the match level, but missed her penalty in the ensuing shootout. Morgan ended her 2016 national team goal scoring campaign with a brace of goals in the team's 8–1 victory over Romania on November 10.

 2017–2018 
Morgan made three appearances at the 2017 SheBelieves Cup, including a start vs England on March 4. On May 26, she was named to the team's roster for two abroad June friendlies vs Sweden and Norway, but withdrew in the coming days after suffering a hamstring injury. Morgan was then included in the United States 23-player roster for the 2017 Tournament of Nations, where she scored one goal in a match vs Japan on August 3. She ended the year strong, leading the team in goals scored with seven.

In 2018, Morgan won US Soccer's Female Player of the Year award. She was nominated alongside Julie Ertz, Tobin Heath, Lindsey Horan and Megan Rapinoe. She tallied 18 goals total in 19 appearances for the United States in 2018. This included her fourth career hat-trick vs Japan at the 2018 Tournament of Nations and her seven goals at the 2018 CONCACAF Women's Championship, where she won golden boot as the tournaments top scorer. She helped the team qualify for the 2019 FIFA Women's World Cup in the semifinal of that tournament scoring twice in a 6–0 win vs Jamaica on October 14. Morgan then won the CONCACAF Women's Championship for the second time in her career after helping her team defeat Canada 2–0 in the final on October 17, where she contributed one goal.

 2019 FIFA World Cup 
In the lead up to the 2019 FIFA Women's World Cup, Morgan scored her 100th career international goal in a friendly vs Australia on April 4, 2019. As a leader of the USWNT at the 2019 FIFA Women's World Cup, Morgan scored five goals in the opening group game against Thailand to equal the World Cup single-game goals record set by Michelle Akers in 1991. Morgan also registered three assists in the game. The team's 13–0 scoreline set a new record for margin of victory in a World Cup match. On July 2, 2019, Morgan became the first woman to score a world cup goal on her birthday, in a 2–1 win over England to reach the 2019 FIFA Women's World Cup final. In the final on July 7, Morgan helped win a penalty that was later converted by Megan Rapinoe to open the scoring, as the United States defeated the Netherlands 2–0. Morgan was awarded the tournament's Silver Boot; finishing as the joint-top scorer with six goals but losing out to Megan Rapinoe on a fewest minutes tiebreaker. She was named to the bench in the opening friendly of the Victory Tour against Ireland but was unused before being ruled out for the rest with a season-ending ankle injury.

2020 Tokyo Olympics
Morgan missed the 2020 CONCACAF Women's Olympic Qualifying Championship and 2020 SheBelieves Cup due to pregnancy. With club and international soccer severely disrupted during the COVID-19 pandemic, Morgan made her national team comeback and first appearance under new head coach Vlatko Andonovski on November 27, 2020, in a friendly against the Netherlands, 509 days since her last appearance against the same opposition in the 2019 World Cup final. In February 2021, she was named to the 2021 SheBelieves Cup roster. In June 2021, Morgan was named in the 18-player United States Women's soccer team roster for the delayed 2020 Tokyo Olympics. She appeared in all six matches for the United States in the tournament, which saw the team take home the bronze medal on August 5 following their 4–3 victory over Australia. Morgan scored in the team's 6–1 group stage win over New Zealand on July 24, and converted a penalty kick in the team's quarter-final shootout win over the Netherlands on July 30. On September 21, 2021, Morgan scored her sixth career international hat-trick for the United States in a friendly against Paraguay in Cincinnati.

 2022 
Ahead of two abroad friendlies vs Australia in November 2021, USWNT head coach Vlatko Andonovski opted to leave a core group of veteran players off of his 22-player roster, which included Morgan. He cited that he needed to give roster spots to younger players to award them valuable minutes ahead of the 2023 FIFA Women's World Cup. As a result of this decision, Morgan subsequently was not included in the 23-player roster for the 2022 SheBelieves Cup in February. On June 13, 2022 Morgan was recalled to the national team ahead of two friendlies vs Colombia and the 2022 CONCACAF W Championship. Morgan helped the team win their third consecutive CONCACAF title and directly qualify for the 2024 Paris Olympics, scoring the game winner on a penalty kick in a 1–0 victory over Canada in the final. She also helped the United States clinch qualification for the 2023 FIFA Women's World Cup scoring twice in the team's opening match against Haiti on July 4, and being in the squad for the team's 5–0 win over Jamaica on July 7. She was named to the tournament's best XI and was awarded golden ball as the tournament's best player. Morgan was also the joint top scorer of the tournament having scored three goals; tied with Julia Grosso, Jessie Fleming, and Kadija Shaw.

Career statistics
College

ClubNotesInternational

Other work
Books and television series

In 2012, Morgan signed with Simon & Schuster to pen The Kicks, a four-book series for middle schoolers. The series is focused on four young girls and features themes of friendship, leadership, and soccer. In a statement released by the publisher, Morgan said she wanted her books to "inspire young girls" and "celebrate" her love of soccer. The first novel, Saving The Team, was released on May 14, 2013, followed by the second novel, Sabotage Season, on September 3, 2013. Saving the Team debuted at number seven on The New York Times Best Seller list for Children's Middle Grade. In 2015, a live-action kids comedy series based on the books, called The Kicks, began airing on Amazon Prime.

Endorsements
Morgan has signed several endorsement deals with businesses including Nike, Panasonic, AT&T, Chobani, McDonald's, P&G, Mondelez International, and Coca-Cola. Time named Morgan the highest paid American women's soccer player in June 2015 attributed mostly to her endorsement deals. In July 2011, she signed a one-year endorsement deal with Bank of America. In January 2012, Morgan and national teammate Heather Mitts became brand ambassadors for health product company, GNC. The same year, she made appearances on behalf of Ubisoft promoting the launch of their video game, Just Dance 4. In 2013, she appeared in television commercials for Bridgestone. She joined a two-year partnership as the spokesperson for ChapStick in October 2013. In 2015, she starred in a Nationwide Mutual Insurance Company commercial that was broadcast nationwide in the United States. She appeared in commercials for Chobani in 2016. In July 2018, Morgan joined the team of ambassadors at Molecule, an athlete recovery mattress and bedding company.

In 2016, Morgan joined UNICEF Kid Power as a UNICEF Kid Power Champion, in an effort to fight global malnutrition and as well as raise awareness among kids, via the world's first "wearable for good", created by UNICEF.

 Sports diplomacy 
In 2017, Morgan and her husband, Servando, traveled to Tanzania as Sports Envoys with the U.S. State Department's Sports Diplomacy Office. In Tanzania, the couple hosted soccer clinics and visited schools, contributing to Sports Diplomacy's mission to promote gender equality and inclusion through sport.

In popular culture

Magazines
Morgan has been featured in a number of magazines. In the 2012 Sports Illustrated Swimsuit Issue, she appeared in a section composed of athletes in body paint. She was featured in the 2013 music issue of ESPN The Magazine replicating Katy Perry's One of the Boys album cover. In May 2015, Morgan was featured on the cover of ESPN Magazine with teammates Abby Wambach and Sydney Leroux. The same year, she appeared on multiple covers of Sports Illustrated before and after winning the 2015 FIFA Women's World Cup. She appeared for a second time in the Sports Illustrated Swimsuit Issue in 2015. Morgan posed for one of the three 2019 Sports Illustrated Swimsuit Issue covers, the other cover models being Tyra Banks and Camille Kostek. She has appeared on the covers of Health and Self magazines. She has been featured in Shape, Vogue, Elle, Time, and Fortune.

Television, film and music video appearances
In 2011, Morgan co-starred with national teammate Hope Solo in a television commercial promoting ESPN's SportsCenter. Morgan and teammate Carli Lloyd were guests on Live with Kelly and Michael following the 2012 Summer Olympics in September 2012. In 2013, Morgan appeared in the ESPN documentary series, Nine for IX. The Nine for IX documentary, The 99ers, in which she appeared focused on the success and legacy of the national team squad that won the 1999 FIFA Women's World Cup. In January 2015, she guest-starred on an episode of Nicky, Ricky, Dicky & Dawn entitled The Quad Test. In April 2015, Morgan joined Abby Wambach on American Idol to announce that the show's season winner would record the official song for Fox's coverage of the 2015 FIFA Women's World Cup. In May of the same year, her likeness appeared on The Simpsons along with Christen Press and Abby Wambach. Morgan was a presenter at the 2015 ESPY Awards and received an ESPY with her teammates for Best Team. In 2018, Morgan made an appearance in the music video for the Maroon 5 song "Girls Like You", which features Cardi B. She was joined by fellow athletes Danica Patrick, Aly Raisman and Chloe Kim who also appeared in the video. In June 2018, Morgan made her acting debut in the direct-to-video film Alex & Me with co-star Siena Agudong, where she portrays a poster of herself who comes to life.

Video games
In July 2015, Morgan, and her Portland Thorns teammates Christine Sinclair and Steph Catley became the first female athletes to appear on the cover of EA Sports' latest FIFA video game, FIFA 16. Morgan, Sinclair, and Catley were chosen to appear on its region-specific packaging in the U.S., Canada, and Australia, respectively, alongside Lionel Messi, who appears in worldwide versions of the game. FIFA 16 was the first edition of the franchise to include women's international teams in the game. In FIFA 19, Morgan was featured throughout The Journey as an interactive character and is credited with a voice role. She was also consulted by EA to help give insight and shape the world of Kim Hunter, the game mode's playable female character.

Ticker tape parade and White House honor

Following the United States' win at the 2015 FIFA Women's World Cup, Morgan and her teammates became the first women's sports team to be honored with a ticker tape parade in New York City. Each player received a key to the city from Mayor Bill de Blasio. In October of the same year, the team was honored by President Barack Obama at the White House.

Personal life
Morgan married soccer player Servando Carrasco on New Year's Eve 2014. The pair met at UC Berkeley where they both played soccer. In October 2019, the couple announced they were expecting a baby girl in April 2020. Their daughter, Charlie Elena Carrasco, was born on May 7 of that year.

Although the name is rarely used any more, Morgan was given the nickname "Baby Horse" by her teammates on the U.S. women's national team for her speed, running style, and youth. Morgan received the key to the city of Diamond Bar, her hometown, on January 24, 2016.

On Sunday, October 1, 2017, Morgan was one of a group of fellow athletes visiting Epcot in Bay Lake, Florida, who were described in a police incident file as being "impaired and verbally aggressive....toward staff and around guests". The group, including Morgan, were removed from the park for "trespass" and no charges were filed. According to a deputy, Morgan was "yelling, screaming and....appeared to be highly impaired". The athlete later posted an apology in a Tweet that read, in part, "I will learn from this and make sure it does not happen again."

In September 2017, Morgan and U.S. teammate Megan Rapinoe were the first two female players in the United States to sign up for the Common Goal campaign, created by Juan Mata of Manchester United, wherein players donate 1% of their wages to support soccer-related charities.

Morgan is an avid martial artist incorporating it into her rigorous workout routine and holding a black belt in Kyokoshin karate. She credits this with improving her balance, strength, flexibility and discipline.

Morgan is vegan. She and NBA player Kyrie Irving were crowned by PETA as Most Beautiful Vegan Celebrities of 2019.

Filmography

Music videos

Honors and awardsWestern New York Flash WPS Championship: 2011Portland Thorns FC NWSL Championship: 2013Lyon Division 1 Féminine: 2016–17
 Coupe de France Féminine: 2016–17
 UEFA Women's Champions League: 2016–17United States U20 FIFA U-20 Women's World Cup: 2008
 CONCACAF Women's U-20 Championship runner-up: 2008United States FIFA Women's World Cup: 2015, 2019
 Olympic Gold Medal: 2012
 Olympic Bronze Medal: 2020
 CONCACAF Women's Championship: 2014, 2018, 2022
 CONCACAF Women's Olympic Qualifying Tournament: 2012, 2016
 SheBelieves Cup: 2016, 2018, 2021,  2022, 2023
 Algarve Cup: 2011, 2013, 2015
 Four Nations Tournament: 2011Individual FIFA U-20 Women's World Cup Silver Ball: 2008
 FIFA U-20 Women's World Cup Bronze Boot: 2008
 FIFA U-20 Women's World Cup All-Star Team: 2008
 ESPY Award Best Female Athlete: 2019
 ESPY Award Best Breakthrough Athlete nominee: 2012
 ESPY Award Best Moment nominee: 2013
 ESPY Award Best Team: 2015, 2019
 Women's Sports Foundation Sportswoman of the Year, Team Sport: 2012
 U.S. Soccer Athlete of the Year: 2012, 2018
 FIFA World Player of the Year finalist: 2012, 
The Best FIFA Women's Player: 2019 (finalist)
 National Women's Soccer League Second Best XI: 2013, 2017
 CONCACAF Player of the Year: 2013, 2016, 2017, 2018
 USWNT All-Time Best XI: 2013
 SheBelieves Cup Golden boot and Golden ball: 2016
 FIFA FIFPRO Women's World 11: 2016, 2017, 2019, 2021, 2022
 CONCACAF Women's Championship Golden Boot: 2018
IFFHS Women's World Team: 2017, 2018, 2019, 2022
 IFFHS World's Woman Team of the Decade 2011–2020
 IFFHS CONCACAF Woman Team of the Decade 2011–2020
FIFA Women's World Cup Silver Boot: 2019
 CONCACAF Women's Championship Golden Ball: 2022
 CONCACAF Women's Championship Best XI: 2022

 NWSL Golden Boot: 2022
 NWSL Best XI: 2022

See also

 List of FIFA Women's World Cup winning players
 List of Olympic medalists in soccer
 USWNT All-Time Best XI
 List of soccer players with 100 or more caps
 List of 2012 Summer Olympics medal winners
 List of University of California, Berkeley alumni in sports

ReferencesMatch reports'''

Further reading
 Morgan, Alex (2015), Breakaway: Beyond the Goal, Simon and Schuster, 
 Grainey, Timothy (2012), Beyond Bend It Like Beckham: The Global Phenomenon of Women's Soccer, University of Nebraska Press, 
 Lisi, Clemente A. (2010), The U.S. Women's Soccer Team: An American Success Story, Scarecrow Press, 
 Longman, Jere (2009), The Girls of Summer: The U.S. Women's Soccer Team and How it Changed the World, HarperCollins, 
 Stevens, Dakota (2011), A Look at the Women's Professional Soccer Including the Soccer Associations, Teams, Players, Awards, and More'', BiblioBazaar,

External links

 
 
 
 
 
 
 National Women's Soccer League player profile
 Orlando Pride player profile
 UC Berkeley player profile
 

1989 births
Living people
2011 FIFA Women's World Cup players
2015 FIFA Women's World Cup players
2019 FIFA Women's World Cup players
Association footballers' wives and girlfriends
21st-century American novelists
American women's soccer players
American women novelists
American Youth Soccer Organization players
California Golden Bears women's soccer players
California Storm players
Division 1 Féminine players
Expatriate women's footballers in France
FIFA Century Club
FIFA Women's World Cup-winning players
Footballers at the 2012 Summer Olympics
Footballers at the 2016 Summer Olympics
Footballers at the 2020 Summer Olympics
Medalists at the 2012 Summer Olympics
National Women's Soccer League players
Novelists from California
Olympic gold medalists for the United States in soccer
Olympique Lyonnais Féminin players
Orlando Pride players
Pali Blues players
People from Diamond Bar, California
People from San Dimas, California
Portland Thorns FC players
Seattle Sounders Women players
Soccer players from California
Sportspeople from Los Angeles County, California
United States women's international soccer players
United States women's under-20 international soccer players
USL W-League (1995–2015) players
Western New York Flash players
Women's association football forwards
Women's Premier Soccer League players
FIFA Women's World Cup-winning captains
Women's Super League players
Tottenham Hotspur F.C. Women players
American expatriate sportspeople in England
Expatriate women's footballers in England
21st-century American women writers
Olympic bronze medalists for the United States in soccer
Medalists at the 2020 Summer Olympics
Women's Professional Soccer players
San Diego Wave FC players
American expatriate women's soccer players
American expatriate sportspeople in France